Penitentiary III is a 1987 American crime drama film written and directed by Jamaa Fanaka. It is the sequel to the 1982 film Penitentiary II. The film stars Leon Isaac Kennedy, Anthony Geary, Steve Antin, Ric Mancini, Marie Burrell Fanaka and Raymond Kessler. The film was released on September 4, 1987, by Cannon Film Distributors.

A man is framed for murder and sent to prison. He is beaten and tortured, then forced to fight the prison's worst killer, a martial-arts fighting midget called Thud.

Cast 
 Leon Isaac Kennedy as Martel "Too Sweet" Gordone
 Anthony Geary as Serenghetti
 Steve Antin as Roscoe
 Ric Mancini as The Warden
 Marie Burrell Fanaka as Chelsea Remington
 Raymond Kessler as "Midnight Thud" Jessup 
 Rick Zumwalt as Joshua
 Magic Schwarz as Hugo
 Jim Bailey as Cleopatra
 "Big Bull" Bates as "Simp"
 "Big Yank" as "Rock"
 Bert Williams as Tim Shoah
 Mark Kemble as Rufus
 Jack Rader as Fred
 Madison Campudoni as "El Cid"
 George Payne as Jess / Inmate #1
 Drew Bundini Brown as "Sugg" / Inmate #2
 Mindi Miller as "Sugar" 
 J. J. Johnston as Announcer #1
 Earl Garnes as Announcer #2
 James Phillips as Suited Gentleman
 Faith Minton as Female Boxer
 Marcella Ross as Female Boxer
 Raye Hollitt as Female Boxer
 Danny Trejo as "See Veer"
 Mary O'Connor as Female Guard
 Gardella Demilo as Female Guard
 Ron Demps as Referee

References

External links
 

1987 films
1980s English-language films
American comedy films
1987 comedy films
American sequel films
Golan-Globus films
Films directed by Jamaa Fanaka
1980s American films